SMARA (SMAll Reconnaissance of Atmospheres) is a proposed mission concept to the planet Jupiter. The mission would involve a swarm of tiny probes weighing less than 1 kilogram which would zip through the clouds of Jupiter by 2030, in conjunction with the ESA's Jupiter Icy Moons Explorer mission, beaming home data about the gas giant's dense atmosphere. According to estimates it could survive for up to 15 minutes in Jupiter's atmosphere and transmit enough information to give scientists a greater understanding of the atmosphere of Jupiter. They will each transmit 20 megabits of data after all. The mission is named after the wind borne fruit released by maple trees.

Instruments 
Much smaller probes, made possible by the miniaturization of electronics, cameras and other instruments, would survive the fall through Jupiter's atmosphere for much longer without a parachute, according to John Moores. NASA's robotic Galileo probe, which dived into Jupiter in 1995, had no camera, so the swarm of microprobes would represent the first look at Jupiter with a resolution greater than 15 kilometers per pixel.

Sciences 
It is believed that the Jovian atmosphere could be a historical record for celestial objects that vaporize in its atmosphere, providing data about the composition of the Solar System. Since the atmosphere of Jupiter is the deepest among all the planets in the Solar System, it can help experts better understand flow dynamics, cloud microphysics and radiative transfer under conditions far different than those on Earth.

References 

Missions to Jupiter
Extraterrestrial aircraft
Extraterrestrial atmosphere entry